Gerald Yetming (葉明 born 4 January 1945) is a Trinidad and Tobago politician and businessman.   Since 2002 he has served as the Member of Parliament representing the constituency of St. Joseph in the House of Representatives of Trinidad and Tobago for the opposition United National Congress (UNC).  Prior to that he was a Senator from 2000 to 2001, and Minister of Finance from 2000 to 2001.

A founding member of the Organisation for National Reconstruction, Yetming served as high commissioner to Canada between 1987 and 1989.  Between 1964 and 2000 he worked for the Royal Bank of Canada and later its successor company, the Royal Bank of Trinidad and Tobago, retiring as Group Director – Regional Banking RBTT Financial Holdings Ltd.

Following the election of Winston Dookeran as UNC political leader in October 2005, Yetming announced that he no longer supported former UNC politician leader Basdeo Panday as Leader of the Opposition and has moved to the Opposition back benches.

On 8 March 2006, Yetming officially resigned from the United National Congress party. He remains the MP for the St. Joseph constituency and has said that he will operate as an independent member of Parliament.

References

External links
 Government biography from Nalis.

Trinidad and Tobago people of Chinese descent
Trinidad and Tobago politicians of Chinese descent
Members of the House of Representatives (Trinidad and Tobago)
Living people
Members of the Senate (Trinidad and Tobago)
Finance ministers of Trinidad and Tobago
Government ministers of Trinidad and Tobago
Organisation for National Reconstruction politicians
United National Congress politicians
High Commissioners of Trinidad and Tobago to Canada
Year of birth missing (living people)